Mike McComish (born 7 December 1983) is a former professional rugby union player for Ulster Rugby. Primarily a  number 8, he can play across the back row.

References

External links
 Ulster profile

1983 births
Living people
Ulster Rugby players
Connacht Rugby players
Rugby union flankers